Tiquinamide is a gastric acid synthesis inhibitor.

References

Drugs for acid-related disorders